Walter Powell may refer to:
 Walt Powell (born 1991), American football player
 Walter D. Powell (1891–1967), American football and basketball coach
 Walter E. Powell (1931–2020), American politician
 Walter W. Powell (born 1951), American sociologist known for studies of the biotechnology industry
 Walter S. Powell (1879–1961), American figure skating official
 W. R. H. Powell (Walter Rice Howell Powell, 1819–1889), British Member of Parliament for Carmarthenshire, 1880–1885, and West Carmarthenshire, 1885–1889
 Walter Powell (politician) (1842–1881), British Member of Parliament for Malmesbury, 1868–1882
 Walter Clement Powell (1850–1883), American photographer
 Walter David Taylor Powell (1831–1906), Native Police officer